Jessica Marie Lunsford (October 6, 1995 – February 27, 2005) was an American nine-year-old girl from Homosassa, Florida, who was murdered in February 2005. Lunsford was abducted from her home in the early morning of February 24, 2005, by John Couey, a 46-year-old convicted sex offender who lived nearby. Couey held her captive over the weekend, during which she was raped and later murdered by being buried alive. The media extensively covered the investigation and trial of Couey.

Jessica Lunsford's murder influenced the introduction of legislation in Florida known as Jessica's Law, designed to protect potential victims and reduce a sexual offender's ability to re-offend, which has since influenced similar legislation in 42 other states.

On August 24, 2007, a judge in Inverness convicted Couey for the kidnapping, sexual battery, and first degree murder of Lunsford, and sentenced him to death. However, Couey died of natural causes in 2009, before his sentence could be carried out.

Investigation
Nine-year-old Jessica Lunsford disappeared in the night on February 24, 2005, from her home in Homosassa, Florida. After approximately three weeks of intense searching for her around the area of her home, John Evander Couey was arrested in Savannah, Georgia, for an outstanding warrant of cannabis possession, but was released after questioning because it was only a local warrant. Couey was a 46-year-old long-time resident of Homosassa with an extensive criminal record, listing dozens of arrests for burglary and was a convicted child sex offender. Due to the laws at the time, Couey received only short sentences and was not monitored after release, despite his record of being an experienced trespasser and his repeated sexual offenses against children.

On March 12, Couey was arrested in Augusta, Georgia, at the request of the Citrus County Sheriff's Office, for questioning about Jessica Lunsford's disappearance due to his residence on West Snowbird Court in Homosassa, only 65 yards from the Lunsford's home, and his criminal record. Couey stated he did not have anything to do with the nine-year-old's disappearance and had moved to Georgia to find a job, only knowing about it from the television news. He was released from police custody after being interviewed.

On March 14, Couey's half-sister Dorothy Dixon gave permission to police to search her trailer at West Snowbird Court in Homosassa. Couey had lived at the West Snowbird Court residence with Dixon, her boyfriend Matt Dittrich, her daughter and son–in-law, Madie and Gene Secord, and her two-year-old grandson, Joshua. During the search a blood-stained mattress and pillows were found in Couey's closet in his room, and forensic analysis discovered both Couey's and Lunsford's DNA on the mattress.

On March 17, Couey was arrested and charged with the murder of Jessica Lunsford, and transported to the Citrus County jail in Florida.

Couey's confession

On March 18, 2005, Couey made an audio-recorded and videotaped confession to having kidnapped, raped and murdered Lunsford.

In his confession, Couey said that he had previously seen Lunsford playing in her yard and thought she was "about six years old". On the night of the abduction, Couey had intended to just burglarize the Lunsfords' home, but saw Jessica and "acted on impulse and he took her". He entered Lunsford's house at about three o'clock in the morning through an unlocked door, awakened Lunsford, told her "Don't yell or nothing", and told her to follow him out of the house. Couey admitted to raping Lunsford in his bedroom, keeping her in his bed that evening, and raping her again in the morning. Couey put her in his closet and ordered her to remain there as he reported for work at "Billy's Truck Lot", which she did. Three days after he abducted her, Couey tricked Jessica into getting into two garbage bags by saying he was going to "take her home". He instead buried her alive as he decided he could do nothing else with the girl.

Discovery of Lunsford's body
Lunsford's body was removed from the ground and transported to the coroner's office, where it was recorded to have undergone "moderate" to "severe" decomposition. According to the publicly released autopsy reports, Lunsford had poked two fingers through the bags before suffocating to death, and the fingers had skeletonized. The coroner ruled that death would have happened even in best circumstances within 2–3 minutes from lack of oxygen.

After the discovery of Lunsford's body at the residence, Dixon stated that a week earlier she had given Couey money for a bus ticket, and that he had telephoned her to say he had moved to Savannah, Georgia. Additionally, Dixon and the other residents of the trailer claimed to have never seen Lunsford at the home or noticed anything strange from Couey's room, which had not been used since he was last there.

On June 30, 2006, a judge ruled that Couey's confession was inadmissible in court because when it was recorded police had not granted Couey's requests for a lawyer, thereby rendering the confession invalid and unreliable under the Fifth and Sixth Amendments of the United States Constitution. Over Couey's objection, the trial court ruled that all evidence collected after the confession, including the recovery of Lunsford's body, would be admitted, as would incriminating statements allegedly made by Couey to investigators and a jail guard.

Conviction

Criminal proceedings
The trial was moved to Miami after officials were unable to seat an impartial jury in Citrus County where the trial was first scheduled to be held.

On March 7, 2007, Couey was found guilty of all charges in relation to Lunsford's death, including first degree murder, kidnapping, burglary with assault or battery upon any person, and capital sexual battery. The jury deliberated for four hours, tasked with recommending either life in prison without the possibility of parole or the death penalty, the only two possible sentences available under Florida law. A week later, after about one hour and 15 minutes of deliberation, a jury recommended Couey be put to death. The case was appealed to the Florida Supreme Court.

On August 11, 2007, a jury overseeing the Lunsford case voted 10-2 that Couey be eligible for the death sentence. Defense for Couey argued that he had suffered from a lifetime of emotional abuse and had a below normal IQ, which would enable him to avoid a death sentence under a 2002 Supreme Court ruling prohibiting the execution of mentally handicapped people. However, the most credible intelligence test rated Couey's IQ at 78, above the standard accepted level of intellectual disability, which is 70.

On August 24, 2007, Couey was sentenced to death, in addition to three consecutive life sentences. However, on September 30, 2009, before the sentences could be carried out, Couey died of natural causes.

Aftermath

Jessica Lunsford Act

Following her death, her father, Mark Lunsford, pursued new legislation to provide more stringent tracking of released sex offenders. The Jessica Lunsford Act was named after her. It requires tighter restrictions on sex offenders (such as wearing electronic tracking devices) and increased prison sentences for some convicted sex offenders. "Jessica's Law" refers to similar reform acts initiated by other states.

Wrongful death and negligence lawsuit
On February 19, 2008, almost three years to the day after her kidnapping and murder, Jessica's father was represented by Jacksonville, Florida lawyers in a pre-trial brief filed against the Citrus County Sheriff's Office and the Florida Department of Law Enforcement. After receiving notice of the pending suit, Citrus County Sheriff Jeff Dawsy stated that he believed the case to be "baseless... There is only one person in the world that should be held responsible for Jessica Lunsford's death and that's John Couey."

Following complaints and suggestions from Citrus County residents that the pending litigation was being pursued out of greed and that had he been a better father his child may still be alive, Mark Lunsford and Jacksonville-based attorneys Eric Block and Mark Gelman held a news conference in Jacksonville, where it was stated that the pending litigation was "not for the money... but for change." Lunsford stated that changes were needed in procedures and policies. It is alleged that Couey had Jessica Lunsford alive in the trailer while Citrus County officials visited the trailer, that police dogs indicated Jessica was being held in the direction of the trailer and were ignored, that Citrus County officials actively pursued Mark Lunsford's father as their prime suspect while evidence pointed elsewhere, and that had Citrus County officials followed up on an outstanding warrant issued by Georgia, that Citrus County officials could have entered Couey's residence and possibly saved the child.

Other media

Mark Lunsford becoming an activist for children's rights after the murder of his daughter Jessica is the subject of the 2011 documentary film, Jessie's Dad.

The abduction of Jessica Lunsford was covered in 2013 on the TV series FBI: Criminal Pursuit in the episode "Lurking Menace".

References

External links
Court TV coverage of Jessica Lunsford case
Court TV coverage of Jessica Lunsford case (Archived)
Article in CourtTV's Crime Library
CASE NO. SC07-1636 Appellee's Answer Brief
Couey Trial State's arguments
 

2005 in Florida
2005 murders in the United States
2000s crimes in Florida
2000s missing person cases
Deaths by person in Florida
Deaths by live burial
February 2005 crimes
February 2005 events in the United States
Incidents of violence against girls
Premature burials
Rape in the 2000s
Rapes in the United States
Sexual assaults in the United States